It! may refer to:

 It! (1967 film), a 1966 horror film directed by Herbert J. Leder
It! The Terror from Beyond Space, a 1958 science fiction film directed by Edward L. Cahn
 "It!" (short story), a story featuring the earliest plant-based swamp monster in literature

See also
It (disambiguation)
IT (disambiguation)